Karl Andreas Bernbrunn (1787–1854), known by the stage name Carl Carl, was a Kraków-born actor and theatre director.

Bernbrunn was born illegitimately  to Maria Anna Alxinger and Karl Andrä Bernbrunn. Maria Anna was the wife of the poet  (1755–1797), and daughter of army supplier Abraham Wetzlar, who converted to Catholicism in 1776.

Bernbrunn became an actor in Munich with Carl Weinmüller. In 1838 he bought the Theater in der Leopoldstadt which he ran in parallel to the Theater an der Wien until 1845. The Theater in der Leopoldstadt was demolished and rebuilt in 1847 under the name Carltheater.

In Munich Bernbrunn married Margarethe Lang.

See also 

Theater in der Josefstadt

References

External links 

1787 births
1854 deaths
Male actors from Kraków
Burials at the Bad Ischl Friedhof